John Mundy may refer to:

 John Mundy (mayor) (died 1538), Lord Mayor of London in 1522 and landowner of Derby
 John Mundy (composer) (c. 1550/1554–1630), English composer
 John Mundy (diplomat), Canadian diplomat
 John Mundy (presenter), British voice-over artist and former news presenter

See also 
 Jack Mundey (born 1929), Australian environmental activist
 Mundy (surname)